Senator Curran may refer to:

Chuck Curran (born 1939), Ohio State Senate
Henry M. Curran (1918–1993), New York State Senate
John Curran (Illinois politician) (fl. 2010s), Illinois State Senate
William Curran (politician) (1885–1951), Maryland State Senate